Pütter See is a lake in the Vorpommern-Rügen district in Mecklenburg-Vorpommern, Germany. At an elevation of 13 m, its surface area is 0.052 km².

Lakes of Mecklenburg-Western Pomerania